The Manjanggul Lava Tube is located in Gimnyeong-ri, Gujwaeup, Jeju City. At up to 23 metres (75') wide, 30 metres (100') high and 8.928 km (5½ miles) long, it is the 12th-longest lava tube in the world and the second longest on Jeju island. It is regarded as having significant scientific and heritage value, owing to its excellent condition of preservation despite its age of formation (about 300,000 to 200,000 years ago).

Lava stalactites and lava stalagmites, lava columns, lava flowstone, lava helictites, lava blisters, cave coral, benches, lava rafts, lava bridges, lava shelves, grooved lava striations, and ropy lava are well-preserved. Among them, a lava column of 7.6 metres (25') is the largest known in the world. There are three entrances and No. 2 heading southward is open to the public.

Entrance No. 3 contains the most favorable habitats for cave life and between Entrances 1 and 2, there is a lower level main tube where most of the living creatures can be found. In the Geomunoreum Lava Tube System, the Manjanggul Lava Tube has the greatest number of living creatures, including the Jeju cave-spider. In the upper part of Entrance 2, there are at least 30,000 common bent-wing bats forming the largest colony of bats confirmed to be living in Korea so far.

See also
List of World Heritage Sites in South Korea
Jeju Volcanic Island and Lava Tubes
Seongsan Ilchulbong
Hallasan
Jeju-do
the Geomunoreum Lava Tube System
Gimnyeonggul

References

Jeju Special Self-Governing Provincial Tourism Association

External links
Jeju Volcanic Island and Lava Tubes, UNESCO
Jeju Special Self-Governing Provincial Tourism Association
Jeju Special Self-Governing Province
Jeju World Natural Heritage
Cultural Heritage Administration of Korea

Lava tubes
Caves of Jeju Province